The List of FlixTrain services in Germany provides a list of all railway services of FlixTrain (FLX) in Germany.

2022 timetable
The information is up to date to December 2022.
The 2022 timetable shows the following routes:

In addition, in Sweden route FLX61 operates 1 or 2 trains a day during the week and 3 trains a day at the weekend from Göteborg Central to Stockholm Central, calling at Falköping Central or Skövde Central, Hallsberg station and Södertälje Syd

2020 timetable (15.12.19 – 12.12.20)

2019 timetable (9.12.18 – 14.12.19)

See also
List of scheduled railway routes in Germany

References

External links 
Flixtrain services
kursbuch.bahn.de Timetables for all railway routes in Germany

Flixtrain
Flixtrain